I10, I-10 or i10 may refer to:
 Hyundai i10, a car 
 , an Imperial Japanese Navy submarine
 Interstate 10, a highway in the United States
 I10-index, an academic index invented by Google

See also
 ICD-10, a classification system for medical diagnoses and procedures